Krogulec may refer to:
Krogulec, Lower Silesian Voivodeship in Gmina Mysłakowice, Jelenia Góra County in Lower Silesian Voivodeship (SW Poland)
Krogulec, Świętokrzyskie Voivodeship, in Świętokrzyskie Voivodeship, Poland
Krogulec, Jizera Mountains in the Jizera Mountains, Poland
pseudonym of Antoni Orłowski (1869–1921), Polish journalist, humorist and satirist